Andrews County is a county in the U.S. state of Texas. It is in West Texas and its county seat is Andrews.

As of the 2020 census, the population was 18,610. The Andrews Micropolitan Statistical Area includes all of Andrews County.

Andrews county was created August 21, 1876, from Tom Green County and organized in 1910. It is named for Richard Andrews, a soldier of the Texas Revolution.

History
Along with the rest of Texas, Andrews County was:

 Part of the Viceroyalty of New Spain from August 18, 1521
 Part of an independent Mexico from September 27, 1821
 Part of the Republic of Texas from March 2, 1836
 Part of a state of the United States of America from December 29, 1845
 Part of the Confederate States of America from March 4, 1861
 Part of a state mandated to rejoin the Union of The United States of America on June 19, 1865, following the surrender of General Robert E. Lee and the Army of Northern Virginia of the Confederate States of America at Appomattox Courthouse, Virginia, that effectively ended the Civil War.
 Part of a state governed by provisional governors during nine years of reconstruction because of the state's insurrection during the Civil War.
 Part of a state whose people were allowed to vote on a new constitution and fully rejoin the Union of the United States of America, with elected representation in the U.S. Congress, by an act of President U.S.Grant, March 30, 1870.

In 1876, the Texas Legislature repealed the constitution of 1869 replacing it with the current constitution and established Andrews County.

Geography
The county contains many playa lakes, the two largest being Baird lake and Shafter Lake.

In the west part of Andrews County on the border with New Mexico (see the state border issue below), a private company, Waste Control Specialists (WCS), formerly owned by the late Harold Simmons and headquartered in Dallas, Texas, operates a  site. The company was awarded a license to dispose of radioactive waste by the TCEQ in 2009. The permit allows for disposal of radioactive materials such as uranium, plutonium and thorium from commercial power plants, academic institutions and medical schools.  The company finished construction on the project in 2011 and began disposing of waste in 2012. There are two radioactive waste landfills at the site. The 30-acre compact site is owned and regulated by the State of Texas for use by Texas, Vermont, and up to 36 other states. The 90-acre federal site is owned by the United States federal government and is used for Department of Energy and other federal waste. The company employs 130 people or about 1% of the total labor force in Andrews and Andrews County.

For years, there has been a simmering dispute over which state these waste sites are lawfully a part of: Texas or New Mexico?  The straight north–south border between the two states was originally defined as the 103rd meridian, but the 1859 survey that was supposed to mark that boundary mistakenly set the border between 2.29 and 3.77 miles too far west of that line, making the Waste Control Specialists waste sites, which are west of the 103rd meridian, along with the current towns of Farwell, Texline, and part of Glenrio, appear to be within the State of Texas.  New Mexico's short border with Oklahoma, in contrast, was surveyed on the correct meridian.  New Mexico's draft constitution in 1910 stated that the border is on the 103rd meridian as intended.  The disputed strip, hundreds of miles long, includes parts of valuable oilfields of the Permian Basin. A bill was passed in the New Mexico Senate to fund and file a lawsuit in the U.S. Supreme Court to recover the strip from Texas, but the bill did not become law.  Today, land in the strip is included in Texas land surveys and the waste sites for all purposes are taxed and governed by Andrews County and The State of Texas.

Major highways

Adjacent counties
 Gaines County (north)
 Martin County (east)
 Midland County (southeast)
 Ector County (south)
 Winkler County (southwest)
 Lea County, New Mexico (west/Mountain Time Zone)

Demographics

As of the census of 2010, there were 14,786 people living in the county. 79.5% were White, 1.5% Black or African American, 1.0% Native American, 0.6% Asian, 15.5% of some other race and 2.0% of two or more races. 48.7% were Hispanic or Latino (of any race).

As of the census of 2000, there were 13,004 people, 4,601 households, and 3,519 families living in the county.  The population density was 9 people per square mile (3/km2).  There were 5,400 housing units at an average density of 4 per square mile (1/km2).  The racial makeup of the county was 77.08% White, 1.65% Black or African American, 0.88% Native American, 0.71% Asian, 0.02% Pacific Islander, 16.79% from other races, and 2.87% from two or more races. 40.00% of the population are Hispanic or Latino of any race.

There were 4,601 households, out of which 40.70% had children under the age of 18 living with them, 63.70% were married couples living together, 9.50% had a female householder with no husband present, and 23.50% were non-families. 21.80% of all households were made up of individuals, and 10.00% had someone living alone who was 65 years of age or older.  The average household size was 2.81 and the average family size was 3.29.

In the county, the population was spread out, with 31.50% under the age of 18, 8.10% from 18 to 24, 27.30% from 25 to 44, 20.50% from 45 to 64, and 12.50% who were 65 years of age or older.  The median age was 34 years. For every 100 females there were 96.30 males.  For every 100 females age 18 and over, there were 91.20 males.

The median income for a household in the county was $34,036, and the median income for a family was $37,017. Males had a median income of $33,223 versus $21,846 for females. The per capita income for the county was $15,916.  About 13.90% of families and 16.40% of the population were below the poverty line, including 20.20% of those under age 18 and 12.70% of those age 65 or over.

Politics

Education
The Andrews Independent School District serves all of Andrews County.

The whole county is in the service area of Odessa College.

Media
The county is served by a weekly newspaper, local stations KACT AM and KACT-FM, nearby stations KBXJ (FM) and KPET (AM), and the various Midland and Odessa radio and TV stations.

Communities

City
 Andrews (county seat)

Census-designated place
 McKinney Acres

Unincorporated communities
 Florey
 Frankel City

Ghost towns

 Coyote Corner
 Fasken
 Old Place Windmills
 Shafter Lake
 Sixteen Corner Windmill
 Waldon Place Windmill

See also

 Andrews County Veterans Memorial
 National Register of Historic Places listings in Andrews County, Texas
 Recorded Texas Historic Landmarks in Andrews County

References

External links
 Andrews County government website
 
 Andrews County from the Texas Almanac
 Andrews County from the TXGenWeb Project
 Andrews County Profile from the Texas Association of Counties

 
1910 establishments in Texas
Populated places established in 1910
Majority-minority counties in Texas